The 2016 Premier League season was the second division of British speedway. The title was won by Somerset Rebels who defeated Sheffield Tigers in the Grand Final.

Final league table

Scoring
Home draw = 1 point
Home win by any number of points = 3
Away loss by 6 points or less = 1
Away draw = 2
Away win by between 1 and 6 points = 3
Away win by 7 points or more = 4

Play-offs

Quarter-finals

Semi-finals

Play Off final
First leg

Second leg

Somerset were declared League Champions, winning on aggregate 100–80.

Final Leading averages

Knockout Cup
The 2016 Premier League Knockout Cup was the 49th edition of the Knockout Cup for tier two teams. It was the last time it would be known as the Premier League Knockout Cup because the following season it would be the SGB Championship Knockout Cup.

Glasgow Tigers were the winners of the competition.

First round

Quarter-finals

Semi-finals

Final
First leg

Second leg

Glasgow were declared Knockout Cup Champions, winning on aggregate 104–76.

Teams
Berwick Bandits

 7.45
 7.18
 6.99
 6.16
 5.65
 5.09
 4.81
 3.76
 3.75
 2.86
 2.67
 1.74

Edinburgh Monarchs

 8.97
 8.00
 7.49
 6.85
 4.34
 4.00
 3.27
 1.00

Glasgow Tigers

 8.57
 8.49
 8.22
 7.53
 7.48
 4.90
 4.23
 3.70

Ipswich Witches

 9.57
 7.91
 7.49
 7.13
 6.48
 5.80
 5.36
 3.48
 2.78
 2.12
 1.88

Newcastle Diamonds

 8.92
 8.47
 7.74
 7.69
 6.12
 6.24
 5.80
 4.98
 1.73

Peterborough Panthers

 10.40 (2 matches only)
 9.83
 8.29
 7.14
 6.58
 6.50
 5.25
 5.18
 4.67
 4.39
 3.95
 3.53
 2.99
 0.36 (3 matches only)

Plymouth Devils

 7.65
 7.16
 6.31
 6.12
 5.76
 5.53
 5.09
 2.38

Redcar Bears

 7.63
 6.84
 6.64
 6.30
 4.66
 4.19
 2.68
 2.06
 1.60

Rye House Rockets

 9.27
 7.09
 5.16
 5.07
 4.60
 4.34
 3.85
 1.62

Scunthorpe Scorpions

 7.18
 7.01
 6.98
 6.12
 5.98
 5.42
 5.41
 4.76
 3.83
 3.38
 3.09
 2.05

Sheffield Tigers

 8.55
 8.39
 7.18
 6.91
 5.02
 3.79
 3.29
 2.32

Somerset Rebels

 9.03
 8.90
 6.62
 6.59
 5.96
 5.02
 2.63

Workington Comets

 7.92
 6.80
 6.74
 6.14
 5.12
 4.67
 3.67

See also
List of United Kingdom Speedway League Champions
Knockout Cup (speedway)

References

Speedway Premier League
Premier
Speedway Premier League